Budrikha is a rural locality (a village) in Mikhaylovskoye Rural Settlement, Kharovsky District, Vologda Oblast, Russia. The population was 45 as of 2002.

Geography 
Budrikha is located 18 km east of Kharovsk (the district's administrative centre) by road. Muryginskaya is the nearest rural locality.

References 

Rural localities in Kharovsky District